Klaus Berger may refer to:

 Klaus Berger (art historian) (1901–2000), German art historian
 Klaus Berger (theologian) (born 1940), German theologian